Center Grove may refer to the following places in the United States:

 Center Grove, Indiana in Johnson County
 Center Grove, Iowa in Dubuque County
 Center Grove, Missouri, a ghost town
 Center Grove, Texas in Houston County

See also 
 Center Grove Township, Dickinson County, Iowa
 Center Grove High School in Greenwood, Indiana